Jeff-Denis Fehr (born 8 September 1994) is a German footballer who plays as a midfielder for SV Rödinghausen.

References

External links
 

German footballers
Association football midfielders
3. Liga players
Regionalliga players
1994 births
Living people
Alemannia Aachen players
BSV Schwarz-Weiß Rehden players
FC Hansa Rostock players
FC Wegberg-Beeck players
SG Sonnenhof Großaspach players
SV Rödinghausen players
People from Stolberg (Rhineland)
Sportspeople from Cologne (region)
Footballers from North Rhine-Westphalia